Frederick William Englehardt (also written as Engelhardt; May 14,1879 in New York, New York – July 25, 1942 in Bronx, New York) was an American athlete who competed mainly in the long jump and triple jump. He competed for the United States in the 1904 Summer Olympics held in St Louis, United States in the triple jump where he won the silver medal. He was also 4th in the long jump.

See also
List of Pennsylvania State University Olympians

References

External links

1879 births
1942 deaths
American male triple jumpers
American male long jumpers
Olympic silver medalists for the United States in track and field
Athletes (track and field) at the 1904 Summer Olympics
Medalists at the 1904 Summer Olympics
Track and field athletes from New York City